The sclerometer, also known as the Turner-sclerometer (from  meaning "hard"), is an instrument used by metallurgists, material scientists and mineralogists to measure the scratch hardness of materials. It was invented in 1896 by Thomas Turner (1861–1951), the first Professor of metallurgy in Britain, at the University of Birmingham.

The Turner-Sclerometer test consists of microscopically measuring the width of a scratch made by a diamond under a fixed load, and drawn across the face of the specimen under fixed conditions.

See also

References

External links
Testing the Hardness of Metals 

Concrete
Hardness instruments
Metallurgy
Mineralogy